(First Sounds of the Independence Anthem), also known as  (Independence Anthem), is painting by Augusto Bracet. It was made in 1922.The artwork is of the genre historical painting, and is on the National Historical Museum of Brazil. It portrays, among others, Pedro I of Brazil and Evaristo da Veiga, in 1822.

The artwork was made with oil on canvas.

Bracet portrayed an event in the process of Brazilian independence, the composition of the Independence Anthem, whose official authorship is by Dom Pedro and Evaristo da Veiga. Dom Pedro is drawn sitting on the piano chair, apparently surrounded by people from the Court, composing the anthem. The portrayal has no heroic elements.

The portrayal of Bracet is based on the memory of Francisco Canto de Mello, furthermore a excerpt from his writings was shown at the catalogue of the first public exhibit of the painting, as contextualisation for the painting.

The artwork of Bracet was shown publicly at the Exposition of Contemporary Art and Retrospective Art of the Independence Centenary, that begun on the 12 November 1922. The painting was selected in 1923, together with artworks by Georgina de Albuquerque, Helios Seelinger and Pedro Bruno, to be bought by the state art collection, the main prize of this fine arts event whose goal was acquiring artworks that alluded to the national formation of Brazil. The selection was done by Flexa Ribeiro, Archimedes Memória and Rodolfo Chambelland, with their task being searching for new iconographic portrayals of historical interpretations of independence.

References

 

Augusto Bracet
Brazilian paintings
1922 paintings
Musical instruments in art